Godawari is a municipality located in the Kailali District of Nepal.

The municipality was established on 18 May 2014 under the name Attariya Municipality by merging the former village development committees of Attariya, Malakheti, Sripur and Geta. At the time of the 2011 Nepal census, it had a population of 78,018 people living in 14,915 individual households.

History
Fulfilling the requirement of the new Constitution of Nepal, 2015, all old municipalities and villages (which were more than 3900 in number) were restructured into 753 new units, thus this municipality upgraded into Godawari Municipality

In 2017, the Godawari village development committee was merged into Attariya and the city's name was changed to Godawari Municipality.

In 2018, Godawari was declared the capital of Sudurpaschim Province.But till now Dhangadhi serves as the temporary capital for the Sudurpashchim Province.

Industry 
BRICK :: Saanvi Brick Industries, located in Attariya, is the first full automatic brick factory in the Far-Western Region of Nepal. It mainly produce the international standard i.e. quality based brick. It uses in government building, personal home ,temple etc. It is locate at dhangadhi road near attariya chowk.

ROSIN :: Divya Rosin terpentine limited mainly prodece the Rosin & Terpentine a chemical based industry.

Tourism 
Godawari River: The Godawari River is a sacred place for Hindus and near it can be found multiple Hindu temples, including those to Shiva Mandir and Hanuman Mandir; as well as a Buddhist Gompa.

Baddi Machheli (बड्डी मछेली ), or simply Machheli: The name Machheli means abundant fish. A hanging bridge crosses the Machheli river and there is a nearby picnic spot.

Transportation
Godawari serves as a gateway to Far-Western Nepal and a transport hub due to its location at the intersection of the Mahendra and Mahakali highways.

Education
The development of a significant number of schools and colleges in Godawari led far western Nepal to become an educational hub. Durga Laxmi Multiple Camus offers various courses on Arts, Commerce and education up to Post Graduate level. It offers a course of computer engineering for class 9 & 10. Saraswati International Model High School is renowned for its quality school-level education. Recently, The school was awarded by British Council for its educational excellence. Geta Eye hospital offers a diploma in ophthalmology. The proposed Dasharatha Chanda Institute of Medical Sciences which is in ward no.12 is under construction and will offer many courses in Medical sciences in future.

Health

Padma Hospital Pvt. Ltd, Sewa Nursing Home provides health services based on Attraiya. Geta Eye Hospital is one of the largest eye hospitals in the country. Geta Eye Hospital is a service-oriented, social organization that provides preventative and curative eye care services in the Far Western Region of Nepal. This hospital provides medical and surgical eye care services with community-based outreach activities such as Surgical eye camps and screening camps in all nine districts of the Seti and Mahakali Zones. The hospital also provides eye care services to a large number of patients visiting from Uttar Pradesh and Uttaranchal of Northern India. The number of patients is increasing every year due to continuous improvement in surgical techniques and relatively low service costs of the medical and surgical treatments. These costs are easily affordable for the middle class as well as poor patients.

Media
To promote local culture, Attariya has Godawari FM 87.9  MHz.

References

External links

UN map of the municipalities of Kailali District

Populated places in Kailali District
Nepal municipalities established in 2014
Municipalities in Kailali District
Nepalese capital cities